Lee Hae-chan (born 10 July 1952) is a South Korean politician who served as Leader of the Democratic Party of Korea from 2018 to 2020. He also served as Prime Minister of South Korea from 2004 to 2006. 

He served as Member of the National Assembly for the Gwanak District from 1988 to 1995 and 1996 to 2008. He served as Minister of Education under President Kim Dae-jung from 1998 to 1999. He presided over controversial education reforms including revamping the college entrance process and lowering the retirement age of teachers. He later served under President Roh Moo-hyun as Prime Minister of South Korea from July 2004 to March 2006.

On 27 August 2018, he was elected the leader of the Democratic Party of Korea.

Political career

Minister for Education
Hae-chan instituted reforms to the college admissions process. At the time was summed up in the slogan that being good at one thing was enough to get into college, was criticised for allegedly lowering dramatically the scholastic competence of the so-called "Lee Hae-chan generation" of then-high school students.

Prime Minister of South Korea
He was nominated by President Roh Moo-hyun to become Prime Minister of South Korea on 28 July 2004, confirmed by the National Assembly on 29 July, and took office on 30 July.

His nomination as prime minister met some resistance due to his record as minister of education, which many consider a failure. Since taking office, however, Lee has proved an able prime minister, being described by some as the most powerful prime minister South Korea has seen.

Golf-game scandal
On 1 March 2006, the Korean Railroad Workers Union and Seoul Subway Union entered a strike together. The strike of railroad and subway at the same time proved to be a fatal blow at the nation's economic activity, especially Seoul area, where traffic heavily depend on subway, which is controlled by these two unions. Prime Minister Lee was supposed to command the situation and mediate the strike; however, he was playing golf at Busan area with local businessmen, and this caused massive distaste among Korean people against Lee for not taking care of the government and people.

See also
Politics of South Korea
Roh Moo-hyun

References

|-

|-

|-

1952 births
Living people
Minjoo Party of Korea politicians
Uri Party politicians
United New Democratic Party politicians
Members of the National Assembly (South Korea)
Jeonju Yi clan
Seoul National University alumni
People from South Chungcheong Province
Education ministers of South Korea